Ella and Louis Again is a studio album by Ella Fitzgerald and Louis Armstrong, released in 1957 on Verve Records. It is the sequel to their 1956 album, Ella and Louis. In contrast to their previous collaboration, this album features seven solo vocal tracks by either Armstrong or Fitzgerald amongst its dozen duet tracks. It was reissued as part of a two-compact disc set in 1995, and in The Complete Ella Fitzgerald & Louis Armstrong on Verve in 1997. It was recorded at Radio Recorders and Capitol Studios, Hollywood.

Reception

In addition to the album not being strictly all vocal duets, whereas on its predecessor Armstrong plays trumpet on every track, here he only plays on six. The Oscar Peterson Trio returns as the duo's backing, this time along with drummer Louie Bellson. Writing for AllMusic, music critic Alex Henderson wrote of the album:One could nit-pick about the fact that Satchmo doesn't take more trumpet solos, but the artists have such a strong rapport as vocalists that the trumpet shortage is only a minor point. Seven selections find either Fitzgerald or Armstrong singing without the other, although they're together more often than not on this fine recording.

Track listing

Side one

Side two

Side three

Side four

CD editions
In 1995 and 2003, a double CD was released with the same content as the double LP, but in 2000, a single CD was released with only the 12 duets, removing the 7 songs with either Armstrong or Fitzgerald solo vocal:

Personnel
Louis Armstrong – vocals; trumpet on "Autumn in New York," "Stompin' at the Savoy," "Gee Baby Ain't I Good to You," "Willow Weep for Me," "Love Is Here to Stay," and "Learnin' the Blues."
Ella Fitzgerald – vocals
Oscar Peterson – piano
Herb Ellis – guitar
Ray Brown – bass
Louie Bellson – drums

Charts

References

1957 albums
Albums produced by Norman Granz
Albums recorded at Capitol Studios
Ella Fitzgerald albums
Louis Armstrong albums
Verve Records albums
Vocal duet albums